Comamonas aquatica is a Gram-negative, oxidase- and catalase-negative, motile bacterium with multitrichous polar flagella from the genus Comamonas and  family  Comamonadaceae.

References

External links
Type strain of Comamonas aquatica at BacDive -  the Bacterial Diversity Metadatabase

Comamonadaceae
Bacteria described in 2003